This article lists the winners and nominees for the NAACP Image Award for Outstanding Drama Series. Originally entitled Outstanding Drama Series, Mini-Series or Television Movie, the award was first given in 1991, before being retitled to its current name in 1995. Grey's Anatomy currently holds the record for most wins in this category with five.

Winners and nominees
Winners are listed first and highlighted in bold.

1990s

2000s

2010s

2020s

Multiple wins and nominations

Wins

 5 wins
 Grey's Anatomy

 3 wins
 Soul Food
 Touched by an Angel

 2 wins
 I'll Fly Away
 In the Heat of the Night
 New York Undercover
 Queen Sugar
 Scandal

Nominations

 10 nominations
 Grey's Anatomy

 7 nominations
 ER

 5 nominations
 Queen Sugar
 Soul Food
 The Wire

 4 nominations
 This Is Us
 Touched by an Angel
 Treme

 3 nominations
 24
 Boardwalk Empire
 Boston Public
 Homicide: Life on the Street
 House
 Lincoln Heights
 New York Undercover
 The Practice
 Scandal
 The Unit

 2 nominations
 The Chi
 Greenleaf
 Godfather of Harlem
 Power
 Underground

References

NAACP Image Awards